ROZA was a radical left political party in Greece that is part of the Coalition of the Radical Left.

ROZA was formed in 2008, by independent left-wing activists and members of the Network for Political and Social Rights. The political target of ROZA is the participatory formation of SYRIZA in combination with its programming radicalization. The party was dissolved in 2013.

References

External links
Official site

2008 establishments in Greece
Communist parties in Greece
Components of Syriza
Luxemburgism
Political parties established in 2008